Sedin-e Do (also Romanized as Sedīn-e Do; also known as Sedeyen-e Do, Seddeyyen-e Pā’īn, Sedeyyen-e Do, Sedeyyen-e Pā’īn, and Seyyedīn-e Do) is a village in Veys Rural District, Veys District, Bavi County, Khuzestan Province, Iran. At the 2006 census, its population was 491, in 71 families.

References 

Populated places in Bavi County